KWMN (99.3 FM) is a radio station serving the Winona, Minnesota area. It airs a sports format, primarily carrying programming from the Fox Sports Radio network.

The station is owned by Leighton Broadcasting, through licensee Leighton Radio Holdings, Inc., and is located at 752 Bluffview Circle, with its other sister stations, KHWK, KGSL, KWNO, and KRIV-FM.

On March 4, 2019, KWNO-FM rebranded as "99.3 The Hawk" under new KHWK-FM calls (the call sign was changed on March 1).

On August 23, 2021, the station flipped to a sports talk format branded as the "Winona Sports Network" under new callsign KWMN. The station will carry University of Minnesota football and basketball, Minnesota Timberwolves basketball, Minnesota Wild hockey, and football and basketball from three local high schools: Winona, Cotter, and Rushford-Peterson. Outside of the local broadcasts, the station will carry programming from Fox Sports Radio.

References

External links
Winona Radio

Radio stations in Minnesota
Sports radio stations in the United States